Diana Miller (March 18, 1902 – December 18, 1927) was an American actress in silent motion pictures. She had red hair and excelled in playing roles which required delineation of character. She was briefly married director and producer George Melford.

Career
Born in Seattle, Washington, Miller entered movies with assistance from actor Wallace Reid. She worked for five years for Famous Players-Lasky before she lost her job and rebounded with the Fox Film Company. She was almost penniless and took work as an extra. By 1925 Miller had worked in nine Fox films.

Miller's first performance was in Honor Among Men (1924). She played the role of Celeste in She Wolves (1925) before making The Kiss Barrier (1925), which featured Edmund Lowe. Her final film roles came in the mid-1920s in The Fighting Heart (1925), When The Door Opened (1925), and The Cowboy and the Countess (1926).

Personal life
Miller was married to actor William Boyd and to actor and director George Melford. She suffered a breakdown about a year before her death and was treated at a sanatorium.

Death
Miller died at the age of 25 in 1927 at the Pottinger Sanatorium in Monrovia, California. The cause of death was pulmonary hemorrhage.

Filmography

References
 
Kingsport, Tennessee Times, "News Notes From Movieland", April 6, 1925, p. 3.
Modesto, California Evening News, "They May Mar", December 16, 1924, p. 2.
Syracuse Herald, "Up and Down The Rialtos", December 21, 1927, p. 26.

External links

Actresses from Seattle
American film actresses
American silent film actresses
Western (genre) film actresses
20th-century American actresses
Respiratory disease deaths in California
Deaths from pulmonary hemorrhage
1902 births
1927 deaths